The 2004 Hockey East Men's Ice Hockey Tournament was the 20th Tournament in the history of the conference. It was played between March 11 and March 20, 2004. Quarterfinal games were played at home team campus sites, while the final four games were played at the Fleet Center in Boston, Massachusetts, the home venue of the NHL's Boston Bruins. By winning the tournament Maine received the Hockey East's automatic bid to the 2004 NCAA Division I Men's Ice Hockey Tournament.

Format
The tournament featured three rounds of play. The team that finishes ninth in the conference is not eligible for tournament play. In the first round, the first and eighth seeds, the second and seventh seeds, the third seed and sixth seeds, and the fourth seed and fifth seeds played a best-of-three with the winner advancing to the semifinals. In the semifinals, the highest and lowest seeds and second highest and second lowest seeds play a single-elimination game, with the winner advancing to the championship game. The tournament champion receives an automatic bid to the 2004 NCAA Division I Men's Ice Hockey Tournament.

Conference standings
Note: GP = Games played; W = Wins; L = Losses; T = Ties; PTS = Points; GF = Goals For; GA = Goals Against

Bracket

Note: * denotes overtime period(s)

Quarterfinals

(1) Boston College vs. (8) Boston University

(2) Maine vs. (7) Merrimack

(3) Massachusetts vs. (6) Massachusetts-Lowell

(4) New Hampshire vs. (5) Providence

Semifinals

(2) Maine vs. (8) Boston University

(3) Massachusetts vs. (4) New Hampshire

Championship

(2) Maine vs. (3) Massachusetts

Tournament awards

All-Tournament Team
F Greg Mauldin (Massachusetts)
F Colin Shields (Maine)
F Mike Warner (Massachusetts)
D Thomas Pöck (Massachusetts)
D Prestin Ryan (Maine)
G Jimmy Howard* (Maine)
* Tournament MVP(s)

Tournament Three Stars
3 Dustin Penner (Maine)
2 Thomas Pöck (Massachusetts)
1 Jimmy Howard (Maine)

References

External links
Hockey East Online

Hockey East Men's Ice Hockey Tournament
HE tournament